Johan M. Nyland (6 October 1931 – 13 April 2007) was a Norwegian politician for the Labour Party.

He was elected to the Norwegian Parliament from Oppland in 1985, and was re-elected on two occasions. He had previously served in the position of deputy representative during the terms 1981–1985.

Nyland was born in Østre Toten and a member of Østre Toten municipality council from 1955 to 1975, serving as deputy mayor during the term 1971–1975. He was also a member of Oppland county council between 1971 and 1987, serving the latter three terms as deputy county mayor.

References

1931 births
2007 deaths
Labour Party (Norway) politicians
Members of the Storting
20th-century Norwegian politicians
People from Østre Toten